, son of Emperor Go-Yōzei and adopted son of regent Uchimoto, was a kugyō (court noble) of the Edo period (1603–1868) of Japan. He held the regent positions of kampaku in 1629 and from 1647 to 1651, and sesshō from 1629 to 1635 and in 1647. He had sons Norisuke and Fuyumoto. Fuyumoto was later adopted by the Daigo family, a branch of the Ichijō family.

Family
 Father: Emperor Go-Yozei
 Mother: Konoe Sakiko – Empress Dowager Chūwa (1575–1630)
 Foster Father: Ichijo Uchimoto
 Wives:
 Daughter of Oda Yorinaga
 Daughter of Nishinotoin Tokinao
 Children:
 Ichijo Norisuke by Daughter of Nishinotoin Tokinao
 Ichijo Fuyumoto by Daughter of Nishinotoin Tokinao

References
 

1605 births
1672 deaths
Fujiwara clan
Ichijō family